Water polo was contested for men only at the 1966 Central American and Caribbean Games in San Juan, Puerto Rico.

References
 

1966 Central American and Caribbean Games
1966
1966 in water polo